Lychas variatus, also known as the marbled scorpion or splendid marbled scorpion, is a species of small scorpion in the Buthidae family. It is native to Australia and New Guinea, and was first described in 1877 by Swedish arachnologist Tamerlan Thorell.

Description
The species grows to about 40 mm in length. Colouration is yellowish-brown mottled, or marbled, with light brown patches. The tail constitutes about half the length of the body, with a prong at the base of the stinger.

Distribution and habitat
As well as New Guinea, the species’ range covers much of northern and eastern Australia. It prefers warm and moist environments, and shelters beneath rocks, bark and plant litter.

Behaviour
The scorpions are terrestrial predators that hunt and feed on invertebrates. They may enter houses. Their sting is painful humans but is not considered to be dangerous.

References

 

 
variatus
Scorpions of Australia
Arthropods of New Guinea
Fauna of New South Wales
Fauna of the Northern Territory
Fauna of Queensland
Fauna of South Australia
Victoria
Fauna of Western Australia
Animals described in 1877
Taxa named by Tamerlan Thorell